Banzai Battalion are a group of recurring characters, created by John Wagner, that appear in 2000 AD. They are tiny gardening robots designed as a bug-fighting military outfit that have been deployed in a garden in Mega-City One where their adventures initially involved Judge Dredd, although in their more recent stories they have branched out into their own series.

Bibliography
They have appeared in a couple of Judge Dredd stories before getting their own eponymous series. All written by John Wagner:

Judge Dredd:
 "Banzai Battalion" (with Henry Flint, in 2000 AD #1135-1137, 1999)
 "No Man's Land" (with Cam Kennedy, in 2000 AD #1183-1185, 2000)
Banzai Battalion:
 "The Fitz" (with Ian Gibson, in 2000 AD #1257-1262, 2001)
 "Save the Fitz!" (with Ian Gibson, in 2000 AD prog 2003, 2002)
 "Robot Wars" (with Steve Roberts, in 2000 AD #1501-1506, 2006)

Collection
The first four stories were collected in a trade paperback by Rebellion in 2005:
Banzai Battalion,

External links
 2000 AD profile

Comics by John Wagner
Judge Dredd characters
British comics
2000 AD comic strips